Coolangatta-Tweed Heads Football Club is an Australian rules football club based in Gold Coast, Queensland. The team currently competes in the AFL Queensland league.

Premierships
Gold Coast Australian Football League 
1978, 1981, 1982, 1983, 1988, 1989

AFL players
Sam Gilbert to 
David Hale to   & 
Wayde Mills to

AFL Women's players
Selina Goodman to 
Leah Kaslar to 
Jordan Membrey to 
Jamie Stanton to 
Nikki Wallace to

External links

1962 establishments in Australia
Australian rules football clubs established in 1962
Queensland State Football League clubs
Australian rules football clubs in New South Wales
Sport in Tweed Heads, New South Wales
Coolangatta
Australian rules football teams on the Gold Coast, Queensland